SpVgg Neckarelz is a German association football club from the city of Neckarelz, Baden-Württemberg, playing in the Verbandsliga Baden.

History
The club was established in June 1921 as Fußballverein Neckarelz and was renamed Spielvereinigung Neckarelz in April 1930. The club reached its highest level of play when they advanced to the Amateurliga Nordbaden (III) in 1974. They played four seasons at that level before failing to qualify for the new Amateuroberliga Baden-Württemberg formed in 1979 out of the four separate circuits then existing in the state. Their best result came as a 6th place finish in 1977. SpVgg has appeared twice in play for the DFB Pokal, the German Cup, going out in the first round 1:6 to Freiburger FC in 1979, and 1:3 to Bayern Munich in 2010.

Following a Verbandliga (VI) title in 2010, Neckarelz became part of the Oberliga Baden-Württemberg, where they competed until 2013, when a league championship earned the club promotion to the Regionalliga Südwest. After three Regionalliga seasons Neckarelz was relegated back to the Oberliga again in 2016.

Current squad

Honours
The club's honours:
 Oberliga Baden-Württemberg
 Champions: 2013
 Verbandsliga Nordbaden
 Champions: 2010
 Runners up: 1979
 Landesliga Odenwald
 Champions: 2006
 Runners up: 2004
 North Baden Cup
 Winners: 2009
 Runners-up: 2012, 2016

Recent seasons
The recent season-by-season performance of the club:

 With the introduction of the Regionalligas in 1994 and the 3. Liga in 2008 as the new third tier, below the 2. Bundesliga, all leagues below dropped one tier.

Key

Stadium
The club plays its home games at the Elzstadion, which has a capacity of 4,500 and was opened in 1963.

References

External links
Official team site
SpVgg Neckarelz profile at Weltfussball.de
Das deutsche Fußball-Archiv historical German domestic league tables 

Football clubs in Germany
Football clubs in Baden-Württemberg
Association football clubs established in 1921
1921 establishments in Germany